Robert 'Bert' Wardrop (born 26 May 1932) is a male former swimmer who competed for Great Britain and Scotland.

Career
Wardrop competed in the men's 100 metre backstroke at the 1952 Summer Olympics. He represented Scotland and won a bronze medal in the 330 yards medley relay event, at the 1954 British Empire and Commonwealth Games in Vancouver. He won the 1952 ASA National British Championships 110 yards backstroke title.

He is the twin brother of Jack Wardrop and the pair learned to swim at Motherwell Baths. They were members of the Motherwell Amateur Swimming & Water Polo Club.

References

1932 births
Living people
Twin sportspeople
Scottish twins
Scottish male swimmers
British male swimmers
Olympic swimmers of Great Britain
Swimmers at the 1952 Summer Olympics
Place of birth missing (living people)
Swimmers at the 1954 British Empire and Commonwealth Games
Commonwealth Games medallists in swimming
Commonwealth Games bronze medallists for Scotland
Male backstroke swimmers
Medallists at the 1954 British Empire and Commonwealth Games